KK Vardar is a basketball club based in Skopje, North Macedonia. Established in 1947, the team has won the Macedonian National League five times and the Macedonian Cup once.

History
On 20 July 1947, MSD Makedonija and ŽSD Pobeda merged into the newly-established Vardar Sports Association, forming a new club named KK Vardar. In the Yugoslav period between 1947 and 1991, Vardar won five Macedonian National League titles (1947, 1953, 1969, 1981, and 1990). During the 2000s, they were runners-up of the Macedonian First League twice, and also lost in the semifinals on three occasions. They won their first Macedonian Cup in 2007, beating KK Strumica 73–66 in the final.

Honours
Macedonian National League (until 1991)
 Winners: 1947, 1953, 1969, 1980–81, 1989–90
Macedonian First League (since 1992)
 Runners-up: 2004–05, 2005–06
 Semifinals: 2002–03, 2003–04, 2006–07
Macedonian Second League
 Winners: 2010–11, 2017–18
 Runners-up: 1999–2000, 2015–16
Macedonian Cup
 Winners: 2007
 Runners-up: 2005, 2006

Arena

KK Vardar plays its home matches at SRC Kale, a multi-purpose indoor sports arena in Skopje. Kale means "Fortress Citadel", named after the Skopje Fortress, located right next to the arena. The hall was built in 1970 and its total seating capacity is 2,500.

The hall is mainly used for handball, although it is suitable for events in others sports and music concerts.

Players

Notable former players

 Goran Samardziev
 Goran Dimitrijević
 Ivica Dimčevski
 Dimitar Mirakovski
 Zlatko Gocevski
 Darko Radulović
 Marjan Gjurov
 Darko Zdravkovski
 Kiril Pavlovski 
 Filip Kralevski
 Bojan Krstevski
 Gjorgji Kočov
 Aleksandar Kostoski
 Enes Hadžibulić
 Aleksandar Sovkovski
 Miroslav Despotović

See also 
 WBC Vardar

References

External links
Official website
Team info at EuroBasket

Basketball teams in North Macedonia
Sport in Skopje
Basketball teams in Yugoslavia
Basketball teams established in 1947
1947 establishments in Yugoslavia